Mehta is an Indian surname, derived from the Sanskrit word  meaning 'great' or 'praised'. It is found among several Indian religious groups, including Hindus, Sikhs, Jains and Parsis. Among Hindus, it is used by a wide range of castes and social groups. Among Oswals, Porwal, and Punjabi Khatris, Mehta is a clan name.

Notable people

Notable individuals with this surname include:
 
 
Aditya Mehta (born 1985), snooker player
Ajay Mehta, Indian actor
Alok Mehta (born 1952), Indian journalist
Amit Mehta (born 1971), United States district judge
Anil Mehta, film director, cinematographer
Ashok Mehta (1947–2012), Indian cinematographer
Atul Mehta (born 1949), Indian cricketer 
Balwantrai Mehta (1900–1965), Gujarat's second Chief Minister
Pratap Bhanu Mehta (born 1967), Indian academic and think tank.
Bejun Mehta (born 1968), American countertenor
Deepa Mehta (born 1950), Canadian film director and screenwriter
Devaanshi Mehta (1996–2012), British-Indian student who started the Asian Donor Campaign
Gita Mehta (née Patnaik; born 1943), Indian writer
Gulshan Kumar Mehta (1937–2009), Indian lyricist and actor
Hansa Jivraj Mehta (1897–1995), Indian reformist, social activist, educator, independence activist, and writer
Harshad Mehta (1954–2001), Indian stockbroker, who was later convicted
Hemant Mehta (born 1983), American-born Indian author
Homi Maneck Mehta (1871–1948), Indian industrialist and philanthropist
Jagat Singh Mehta (1922–2014), Foreign Secretary of India
Jamshed Nusserwanjee Mehta (1886–1952), Mayor of Karachi
Jay Mehta (born 1961), businessman and owner of the Mehta Group
Jehangir Mehta (born 1971), chef and owner of New York City restaurants
Jivraj Narayan Mehta (1887–1978), Gujarat's first Chief Minister
Kalu Mehta (1440–1522), father of Sikhism's founder Guru Nanak
Madan Lal Mehta (1932–2006), theoretical physicist in the field of random matrix theory
Mahendra Mehta (born 1955), CEO, Vedanta Resources; also known as Mahendar Singh
Mehli Mehta, (1908–2002): musician; founder of the Bombay Philharmonic and Bombay String Orchestras
Nakuul Mehta (born 1983), actor and model
Nariman Mehta (1920–2014), organic chemist
Narsinh Mehta, Gujarati spiritual poet
Nicky Mehta, singer, songwriter, member of Canadian folk trio The Wailin' Jennys
Phiroz Mehta (1902–1994), writer on religious topics, and philosopher
Pherozeshah Mehta (1845–1915), Indian political leader, activist, and lawyer
Russell Mehta, Indian businessman
Sahil Mehta (born 1988), Indian actor
Sargun Mehta (born 1988), Indian model, comedian, dancer, presenter and actress
Shailendra Raj Mehta (born 1959), Indian economist, president and director, MICA
Shekhar Mehta (1945–2006), Ugandan-born Kenyan rally driver
Sonny Mehta (born Ajai Singh Mehta; 1942–2019), Indian book editor
Suketu Mehta (born 1963), India-born American writer
Tyeb Mehta (1925–2009), Indian painter
Uday Singh Mehta, American political scientist
Ved Mehta (1934-2021), blind  Indian-American writer
Veer Singh Mehta (born 1949), Indian neurosurgeon
Veronica Mehta, British Punjabi singer
Vikram Bhagvandas Mehta (1946–2014), Indian mathematician
Zarin Mehta (born 1938), executive director of the New York Philharmonic Orchestra; brother of Zubin 
Zubin Mehta (born 1936), Indian conductor of Western classical music

References 

Indian surnames
Gujarati-language surnames
Khatri clans